Marcelo Arévalo and Jeevan Nedunchezhiyan were the defending champions but chose not to defend their title.

Evan King and Nathan Pasha won the title after defeating Santiago González and Aisam-ul-Haq Qureshi 7–5, 6–2 in the final.

Seeds

Draw

References

External links
 Main draw

Monterrey Challenger - Doubles